The Gift is a Philippine television drama series broadcast by GMA Network. Directed by Lord Alvin Madridejos, it stars Alden Richards. It premiered on September 16, 2019 on the network's Telebabad line up replacing Love You Two. The series concluded on February 7, 2020 with a total of 105 episodes. It was replaced by Descendants of the Sun in its timeslot.

The series is streaming online on YouTube.

Premise
Joseph, a vendor in Divisoria uses his charm and enthusiasm to get through the hard days. Together with his adoptive family Strawberry and Char, he continues to find happiness despite the challenges in life. One day, he gets in a near-death accident leading him to lose his eyesight and gain the ability of clairvoyance.

Cast and characters

Lead cast
 Alden Richards as Joseph Toledo / Serafin "Sep" Apostol

Supporting cast
 Jean Garcia as Nadia Montes-Toledo/Marcelino
 Jo Berry as Strawberry "Straw" Apostol Anzures
 Elizabeth Oropesa as Charito "Char" Apostol
 Martin del Rosario as Jared M. Marcelino
 Mikee Quintos as  Amor
 Christian Vasquez as Javier R. Marcelino
 Rochelle Pangilinan as Francine Delgado
 Mikoy Morales as Benedict "Bistek" Tecson 
 Divine Tetay as Tonya
 Betong Sumaya as Asi
 Luz Valdez as Puring Reyes Marcelino
 Victor Anastacio as Andoy
 Ysabel Ortega as Sabina M. Marcelino
 Thia Thomalla as Faith Salcedo

Guest cast
 TJ Trinidad as Gener Toledo
 Meg Imperial as Lizette 
 Ruru Madrid as Eloy
 Louise Bolton as Maggie
 Gerald Madrid as Carlo
 Michael Flores as Rambo
 Mosang as Baby
 Allan Paule as Andres
 Aaron Villanueva as little Sep
 Khaine Hernandez as young Sep
 Leandro Baldemor as Luis
 Jackie Lou Blanco as Ortiz
 Skelly Clarkson as Taba
 John Kenneth Giducos as Tolits
 Dunhill Banzon as Dan
 Jay Arcilla as Mando
 Cheska Diaz as Felicia Salcedo
 Lui Manansala as Daisy
 Orlando Sol as Bomber
 Omar Flores as Alcazar
 Simon Ibarra as a priest
 Dion Ignacio as a former boyfriend
 Rosanna Iringan as Mrs. Tan
 JD Lopez as Nonoy
 Froilan Manto as a manager 
 Zane Mariñas as Manny
 Ranty Portento as Mike
 Dexter Macalintal as Dr. Viena
 Froilan Sales as a policeman
 Shermaine Santiago as a bank teller
 Regine Tolentino as Anna
 Peggy Rico Tuazon as Niño's mother
 Lander Vera-Perez as a syndicate member
 Roadfill as Benok
 Brylle Mondejar as a doctor
 Marlon Mance as Castillo
 Gilleth Sandico as Gloria
 Marx Topacio as young Javier
 Kristine Abbey as Abby
 Faith da Silva as young Charito
 Tanya Gomez as Lourdes
 Marnie Lapus as Lian
 Dave Bornea as Jacob
 Ramon Christopher as Alcazar
 Rosanna Iringan as Mrs. Tan
 Bembol Roco as Crispin Anzures
 Raquel Monteza as Lolita Anzures
 Dominic Roco as young Crispin
 Sophie Albert as Helga Ventura-Apostol
 Robert Ortega as Oliver
 Mika Gorospe as Lorraine
 Baste Granfon as Kyle Cordero
 Smokey Manaloto as Bradley Ventura
 Leanne Bautista as Meryll Ventura
 Channel Morales as Paula
 Epi Quizon as Gabriel
 Dindo Arroyo as Johnson
 Biboy Ramirez as Caleb
 Muriel Lomadilla as Jun
 Paolo Paraiso as Lester

Accolades

References

External links
 
 

2019 Philippine television series debuts
2020 Philippine television series endings
Filipino-language television shows
GMA Network drama series
Television shows set in the Philippines